Xenorhabdus koppenhoeferi  is a bacterium from the genus of Xenorhabdus which has been isolated from the nematode Steinernema scarabaei in the United States.

References

Further reading

External links
Type strain of Xenorhabdus koppenhoeferi at BacDive -  the Bacterial Diversity Metadatabase

Bacteria described in 2006